Hillsdale is a town in Garfield County, Oklahoma, United States. The population was 121 at the 2010 census, a 19.8 percent gain from the figure of 101 in 2000.

Geography
Hillsdale is located in northwestern Garfield County at  (36.562513, -97.992601).

Demographics

As of the census of 2000, there were 101 people, 36 households, and 29 families residing in the town. There were 48 housing units at an average density of 131.8 per square mile (51.5/km2). The racial makeup of the town was 97.03% White, and 2.97% from two or more races. Hispanic or Latino of any race were 4.95% of the population.

There were 36 households, out of which 33.3% had children under the age of 18 living with them, 69.4% were married couples living together, 2.8% had a female householder with no husband present, and 19.4% were non-families. 19.4% of all households were made up of individuals, and 8.3% had someone living alone who was 65 years of age or older. The average household size was 2.81 and the average family size was 3.17.

In the town, the population was spread out, with 30.7% under the age of 18, 5.9% from 18 to 24, 27.7% from 25 to 44, 24.8% from 45 to 64, and 10.9% who were 65 years of age or older. The median age was 36 years. For every 100 females, there were 102.0 males. For every 100 females age 18 and over, there were 105.9 males.

The median income for a household in the town was $29,028, and the median income for a family was $29,286. Males had a median income of $27,813 versus $21,250 for females. The per capita income for the town was $11,478. There were 14.3% of families and 16.0% of the population living below the poverty line, including 20.6% of under eighteens and none of those over 64.

Education
Its school district is Kremlin-Hillsdale Schools.

References

External links
  Encyclopedia of Oklahoma History and Culture - Hillsdale

Towns in Garfield County, Oklahoma
Towns in Oklahoma